Crank is a village near Rainford, Merseyside, England in the Metropolitan Borough of St Helens.

Within the boundaries of the historic county of Lancashire, it is known locally for its ghost stories 'The White Rabbit of Crank' and 'Crank Caverns'.

The village has one public house - The Red Cat, and is home to Fairfield Independent Hospital.

See also
Crank Caverns

References

Towns and villages in the Metropolitan Borough of St Helens
Rainford